Curmătura or Curmătură („mountain saddle“ in Romanian) may refer to several villages in Romania:

 Curmătură, a village in Lupșa Commune, Alba County
 Curmătura, a village in the town of Nehoiu, Buzău County
 Curmătura, a village in Sichevița Commune, Caraş-Severin County
 Curmătura, a village in Giurgița Commune, Dolj County
 Curmătura, a village in Păcureți Commune, Prahova County

Mountain cabins 
 Cabana Curmătura in Piatra Craiului Mountains

See also 
 Curmătura River (disambiguation)